The 2017 Liga 3 Bengkulu is the third edition of Liga 3 Bengkulu as a qualifying round for the 2017 Liga 3. 

The competition scheduled starts on 30 July 2017.

Teams
There are 10 clubs which will participate the league in this season.

References 

2017 in Indonesian football